Nathan Augustus Cobb (30 June 1859, in Spencer, Massachusetts – 4 June 1932, in Baltimore, Maryland) is known as "the father of nematology in the United States".

He provided the foundations for nematode taxonomy and described over 1000 different nematode species.  An individual with a variety of skills, he made significant contributions to a number of scientific disciplines and the USDA Nematology Laboratory, originally established with him as the director, continues today.

He was the father of Frjeda Blanchard, the geneticist who first demonstrated Mendelian inheritance in reptiles.

Books by Cobb
This list can be accessed via the Biodiversity Heritage Library. The list is incomplete.

"A Nematode formula." (1890) Sydney : C. Potter
"Nematodes, mostly Australian and Fijian." (1893) Sydney : F. Cunninghame & Co., printers
"The sheep-fluke." (1897) Sydney : W. A. Gullick, gov't. printer
"Letters on the diseases of plants." (1897) Sydney : W. A. Gullick, gov't. printer
"Seed wheat: an investigation and discussion of the relative value as seed of large plump and small shrivelled grains." (1903) Sydney : W. A. Gullick, gov't. printer
"Letters on the diseases of plants. Second series." (1904) Sydney : W. A. Gullick, gov't. printer
"Methods of using the microscope, camera-lucida and solar projector for purposes of examination and the production of illustrations." (1905) Honolulu : Hawaiian Sugar Planters' Association
"Contributions to a science of nematology." (1914–35) Baltimore : Williams & Wilkins Co.

References
 Nathan Augustus Cobb: A Biography (including photos of Cobb)
 The Nathan A. Cobb Nematology Foundation
 Society of Nematologists

1859 births
1932 deaths
American biologists
Nematologists
People from Spencer, Massachusetts
19th-century American scientists
20th-century American scientists
Scientists from Massachusetts
Presidents of the American Society of Parasitologists